Djimla is a district in Jijel Province, Algeria. It was named after its capital, Djimla.

Municipalities
The district is further divided into 2 municipalities:
Djimla
Boudriaa Ben Yadjis